(Main list of acronyms)


 I – (s) Iodine – One (in Roman numerals)

I0–9
 I2WD or I2WD – (i) U.S. Intelligence and Information Warfare Directorate (CERDEC)

IA
 ia – (s) Interlingua language (ISO 639-1 code)
 IA – (s) Iowa (postal symbol)
 IAAF – (i) International Association of Athletics Federations ("International Amateur Athletics Federation" from 1912 to 2001; renamed "World Athletics" in 2019)
 IAAL – (i) I Am A Lawyer
 IAAS - (p) Infrastructure-as-a-Service 
 IAB – (i) International Association for Biologicals
 IACREOT – (i) International Association of Clerks, Recorders, Election Officials, and Treasurers
 IAD – (i) Ion Assisted Deposition
 IADS – (i) Integrated Air Defence System
 IAEA – (i) International Atomic Energy Agency
 IAF – {i} Industrial Areas Foundation
 IAFG – (i) Information Assurance Focus Group
 IAI – (i) International African Institute – Israel Aircraft Industries
 IANA – (i) Internet Assigned Numbers Authority
 IANAL – (i) I Am Not A Lawyer
 IAPD
 International Associates of Paediatric(sic) Dentistry
 (i) Investment Adviser Public Disclosure
 iShares Asia Pacific Dividend
 IAQ – (i) Indoor air quality – Infrequently Asked Questions
 IAS – (i) Image Assessment System
 IASIP – (i) It's Always Sunny in Philadelphia
 IATA – (a/i) International Air Transport Association
 IATF – International Automotive Task Force
 IATSE – International Alliance of Theatrical Stage Employees
 IAU – (i) International Association of Universities – International Astronomical Union
 IAUC – (i) International Astronomical Union Circular
 IAW – (i) In Accordance With

IB
 IB – (i) International Baccalaureate
 IBA – (i) Important Bird Area
 IBD – (i) Inflammatory Bowel Disease
 IBDM – (i) Information Based Decision Making
 IBDS – (i) Integrated Biological Detection System – International Business Development Specialist 
 IBF - International Boxing Federation
 IBGe – (i) Isobutylgermane
 IBGE – (i) Instituto Brasileiro de Geografia e Estatística (Portuguese, "Brazilian Institute of Geography and Statistics")
 IBHOF - International Boxing Hall of Fame
 IBM – (i) International Business Machines
 ibo – (s) Igbo language (ISO 639-2 code)
 IBRD – (i) International Bank for Reconstruction and Development (part of the World Bank)
 IBS – (i) Irritable Bowel Syndrome

IC
 IC
 (s) Ice Crystals (METAR Code)
 Iceland (FIPS 10-4 country code)
 (i) Integrated Circuit - [inner circle]
 ICANN – (a) Internet Corporation for Assigned Names and Numbers
 ICAO – (i) International Civil Aviation Organization
 ICBM – (i) Intercontinental Ballistic Missile
 ICBM – I see (phonetically "c") BatMan
 ICBN – (i) International Code of Botanical Nomenclature
 ICC
 (i) Integrated Command and Control
 International Criminal Court
 International Cricket Council
 Interstate Commerce Commission
 International Chamber of Commerce
 ICD
 (i) Implantable Cardioverter-Defibrillator
 Initial Capabilities Document
 International Classification of Diseases
 ICE
 (i/a) (U.S.) Immigration and Customs Enforcement
 In case of emergency
 ICES – (a/i) International Council for the Exploration of the Sea
 ICF – (i) Intelligent Community Forum
 ICHTHYS – (a) Iesous Christos, Theou Yios, Soter (Greek, "Jesus Christ, Son of God, Savior")
 ICM
 (i) Improved Conventional Munition
 Integrated Collection Management
 International Congress of Mathematicians
 Iraq Campaign Medal
 ICMP – (i) Internet Control Message Protocol
 ICNAF – (i) International Commission for the Northwest Atlantic Fisheries (became NAFO in 1978)
 ICNI – (i) Integrated Communication, Navigation, and Identification
 ICO – (i) Intermediate Circular Orbit
 ICP
 (i) Inductively coupled plasma
 Insane Clown Posse
 ICPE – (a/i) International Conference on Pharmacoepidemiology, the annual conference of the International Society for Pharmacoepidemiology
 ICRAF – (i) International Centre for Research in Agroforestry (a.k.a. World Agroforestry Centre since 2002)
 ICRISAT – (i/a) International Crops Research Institute for the Semi-Arid Tropics
 ICRL – (i) Individual Component Repair List
 ICRS – (i) International Celestial Reference System
 ICS
 (i) In-Country Support
 Intelligence and Communications Systems
 Interim Contractor Support
 ICSI – (p) Intracytoplasmic Sperm Injection
 ICT – (i) Information and communication technologies
 ICTH – (i) Island Closest to Heaven/Hell Final Fantasy VIII
 ICV – (i) Infantry Carrier Vehicle
 ICW
 (i) In Co-ordination With
 Indonesia Corruption Watch
 Infectious and Chemotherapeutic Waste
 Insulating Concrete Wall
 Integral Crystalline Waterproofing
 (p) Interactive Courseware
 (i) International Championship Wrestling (defunct US professional wrestling promotion)
 ICYMI – (i) In Case You Missed It
 ICZN
 (i) International Code of Zoological Nomenclature
 International Commission on Zoological Nomenclature

ID
 id – (s) Indonesian language (ISO 639-1 code)
 ID
 (s) Idaho (postal symbol)
 (p) Identity
 (s) Indonesia (FIPS 10-4 country code; ISO 3166 digram)
 (i) Infantry Division
 Intelligent Design
 ID10T Error – (i) Idiot User Error (IT help desk inside joke) 
 IDA
 (i) U.S. Institute for Defense Analyses
 International Development Association (part of the World Bank
 IDC – (i) International Data Corporation
 IDDI – (i) I don't do initialisms (see irony)
 IDE
 (i) Integrated Development Environment
 Integrated Drive Electronics
 IDeA – (a) Improvement and Development Agency, the former name of Local Government Improvement and Development in the United Kingdom
 IDEA
 (a) Individuals with Disabilities Education Act (U.S.)
 International Data Encryption Algorithm
 International Design Excellence Awards
 IDF
 (i) Israel Defense Forces
 Intel Development Forum
 International Dairy Federation
 IDGAF – (i) I don't give a f**k
 IDK – (i) I don't know
 IDKIBTI – I don't know, I'm black, that's it
 IDL – (i) Interface Definition Language
 IDN – (s) Indonesia (ISO 3166 trigram)
 ido – (s) Ido language (ISO 639-2 code)
 IDR – (s) Indonesian rupiah (ISO 4217 currency code)
 IDTS – (i) I don't think so

IE
 i.e. – (i) id est (Latin, roughly "that is")
 ie – (s) Interlingue language (ISO 639-1 code)
 IE –  (i) Indo-European languages – Internet Explorer – (s) Ireland (ISO 3166 digram) – Iced Earth
 IEA – (i) International Energy Agency
 IEC – (i) International Electrotechnical Commission
 IED – (i) Improvised Explosive Device
 IEEE – (p) Institute of Electrical and Electronics Engineers ("I triple-E")
 IELTS – (a) International English Language Testing System
 IER – (i) Information Exchange Requirement
 IET – (i) Institution of Engineering and Technology
 IET – (ii) Initial Entry Training
 IETF – (i) Internet Engineering Task Force
 IEW – (i) Intelligence and Electronic Warfare

IF
 IFAB – (i) International Football Association Board
 IFAH – (i) International Federation for Animal Health
 IFAP – (i) International Federation of Agricultural Producers, (i) International Fashion Academy Pakistan
 IFC – (i) International Finance Corporation (part of the World Bank) – (a) Independent Film Channel
 IFF – (i) Identification, Friend or Foe – Individually Fresh Frozen – International Flavors and Fragrances
 IFFN – (i) Identification, Friend, Foe, or Neutral
 IFO – (i) Identified Flying Object (see also UFO)
 IFOR – (p) UN Implementation Force – (i) Institute for Operations Research – International Fellowship of Reconciliation
 IFOV – (i) Instantaneous Field of View
 IFPI – (i) International Federation of Phonographic Industries
 IFR – (i) Instrument Flight Rules
 IFRB – (i) International Frequency Registration Board
 IFV – (i) Infantry Fighting Vehicle

IG
 ig – (s) Igbo language (ISO 639-1 code)
 IG – (i) Inspector General
 IGFA – International Game Fish Association
 IGNOU – (a) Indira Gandhi National Open University
 IGS – (i) International Ground Station
 IGY – (i) Israeli Gay Youth – International Geophysical Year

IH
 IHÉS – (i) Institut des Hautes Études Scientifiques (French, Institute of Advanced Scientific Studies)
 IHH – (i) Idiopathic Hypogonadotropic Hypogonadism
 IHO – (i/a) International Hydrographic Organization
 IHOP – (i/a) International House of Pancakes, the original name of this American restaurant chain ("EYE-hop")
 IHR – (i) Institute for Historical Review
 IHSI – Institutum Historicum Societatis Iesu (Jesuit Historical Institute)

II
 ii – (s) Sichuan Yi language (ISO 639-1 code)
 II – (s) Two (in Roman numerals)
 IICA – (i) Inter-American Institute for Cooperation on Agriculture
 IIE – (i) Innovative Interstellar Explorer
 iii – (s) Sichuan Yi language (ISO 639-2 code)
 III – (s) Three (in Roman numerals)
 IIMSS – If I May Say So
 IIRC – If I Remember Correctly, If I Recall Correctly
 IISS – (i) International Institute for Strategic Studies
 IIT – (i) Illinois Institute of Technology – Indian Institutes of Technology – Indiana Institute of Technology
IITM – (i) Image Institute of Technology & Management – Indian Institute of Technology Madras – Indian Institute of Tropical Meteorology
 I/ITSEC – (a) Interservice/Industry Training, Simulation and Education Conference ("eye-it-sec" or "it-sec")

IJ
 IJN – (i) Imperial Japanese Navy (World War II)
 IJWP – (i) Interim Joint Warfare Publication

IK
 ik – (s) Inupiaq language (ISO 639-1 code)
 IKEA – (a) Ingvar Kamprad (the company's founder), Elmtaryd (the farm where he was born and raised), Agunnaryd (a village and parish near the farm)
 iku – (s) (s) Inuktitut language (ISO 639-2 code)

IM
 IM
 (s) Isle of Man (FIPS 10-4 territory code)
 (i) Instant Message (Internet speech)
 IMA
 (i) Intermediate Maintenance Activity
 Institute of Mathematics and Applications
  – (i) International Migratory Bird Day
 IMDb – Internet Movie Database
 IME - (i) In My Experience
 IMF
 (i) id music file/id's music format (audio file format)
 Impossible Missions Force, the protagonist organization in the Mission: Impossible media franchise
 International Monetary Fund (the most common use for the initialism)
 IMHO – (i) In My Humble/Honest Opinion, cf. IMO
IMIST AMBO – used to facilitate an informed clinical handover between paramedics, emergency department staff or other healthcare similar to SBAR: Identification, Method of Injury, Index of concern, Signs, Treatment, Allergies, Medication, Background, and Other
 IML – (i) International Mister Leather
 IMLAST – (i) International Movement for Leisure Activities in Science and Technology – see MILSET
 IMNM - (i) - Immune-mediated necrotizing myopathy a rare, but serious ADR of statins 
 IMNSHO – (i) In My Not So Humble Opinion
 IMO (in my opinion) – (i) In My Opinion, also "imo", cf.  IMHO
 IMPAC – (a) International Merchant Purchase Authorization Card
 IMPACT – (a) International Medical Products Anti-Counterfeiting Taskforce
 IMPATT – (p) IMPact Avalanche Transit Time diode
 IMPT – (i) Institute of Maxillofacial Prosthetists and Technologists
 IMR – (i) Inzhenernaya Mashina Razgrazhdeniya (Russian Инженерные Машины Разграждения, "Engineer Vehicle Obstacle-Clearing") †
 IMRI
 (i) Industrial Membrane Research Institute
 Information Management Research Institute
 Institut pour le management de la recherche et de l'innovation (French, "Institute for the Management of Research and Innovation")
 International Market Research Information
 Intraoperative Magnetic Resonance Imaging
 IMRO
 Internal Macedonian Revolutionary Organization
 Irish Music Rights Organisation
 IMRL – (i) Individual Material Readiness List
 IMS
 (i) Information Management System
 International Meat Secretariat
 Ion Mobility Spectrometer
 IMSA
 (i) Illinois Mathematics and Science Academy
 International Mind Sports Association
 International Motor Sports Association
 IMsL – (a) International Ms. Leather
 IMT – (i) Integrated Management Tool
 IMU – (i) International Mathematical Union

IN
 In – (s) Indium
 IN – (s) India (FIPS 10-4 country code; ISO 3166 digram) – Indiana (postal symbol) – Infantry
 ina – (s) Interlingua language (ISO 639-2 code)
 INA  – (p) Immigration and Nationality Act
 INAS – (a) International Near-Earth Asteroid Survey
 INC – (i) Indian National Congress, one of the national political parties in India
(i) Iglesia ni Cristo (Filipino, "Church of Christ")
Indian National Congress
International Network of Crackers
Iraqi National Congress
 INCITS – (p) InterNational Committee for Information Technology Standards
 ind – (s) Indonesian language (ISO 639-2 code)
 IND – (s) India (ISO 3166 trigram)
 inet – (a) the Internet
 INDIGO – (p) (U.S.) INtelligence DIvision Gaming Operation 
 INFORMS – (a) (U.S.) Institute for Operations Research and the Management Sciences
 INFOSEC – (p) Information Security
 INLA – (i) Irish National Liberation Army
 INMARSAT – (p) International Maritime Satellite organization
 INR – (s) Indian rupee (ISO 4217 currency code)
 INRI – (a/i) Iesus Nazarenus Rex Iudæorum (Latin, "Jesus of Nazareth, King of the Jews")
 INRIA – (p) Institut national de recherche en informatique et en automatique
 INS – (i) Immigration and Naturalization Service
 InSAR – (p) Interferometric synthetic aperture radar
 INST – (p) Information Standards and Technology
 in trans. – (p) in transitu (Latin, "in transit")
 INTSUM – (p) Intelligence Summary
 INTERFET – (p) International Force for East Timor

IO
 io – (s) Ido language (ISO 639-1 code)
 IO – (s) British Indian Ocean Territory (ISO 3166 digram; FIPS 10-4 territory code)
 IOC
 (i) Initial Operational Capability
 Intergovernmental Oceanic Commission
 International Olympic Committee
 International Ornithological Congress
 IOHK – Input Output Hong Kong. Redirected to Charles Hoskinson
 IOLTA – (a) Interest on Lawyer Trust Accounts (charitable funding mechanism, especially for legal aid)
 IOM
 (i) Iowa, Ohio, Michigan (soybean origin)
 Institute of Medicine
 International Organisation for Migration
 Isle of Man
 IONA – (i) Islands of the North Atlantic (alternate name for Great Britain, Ireland, the Isle of Man, and related islands)
 IOT – (s) British Indian Ocean Territory (ISO 3166 trigram)
 IOT&E – (i) Initial Operational Test and Evaluation
 IOU – (p) "I Owe You" (Promissory note)

IP
 IP – 
(s) Clipperton Island (FIPS 10-4 territory code)
(i) Initial Point – Intellectual Property – Internet Protocol
 IPA – (i) India Pale Ale – International Phonetic Alphabet – Isopropyl alcohol
 IPB – (i) Intelligence Preparation of the Battlefield
 IPCC –
(i) Intergovernmental Panel on Climate Change
Independent Police Complaints Commission
 ipk – (s) Inupiaq language (ISO 639-2 code)
 IPL – (i) Inferior Parietal Lobule
 IPN – (i) Instytut Pamieci Narodowej (Polish, "Institute for National Memory")
 IPO – (i) Initial public offering
 IPR –
(i) In Progress Review
Intellectual Property Rights
Intelligence Production Requirement
 IPT – (i) Integrated Product/Project Team
 IPTS – (i) Institute for Prospective Technological Studies
 IPTV – (p) Internet Protocol TeleVision
 IPW – (i) Interrogation of Prisoners of War

IQ
 iq – (i) idem quod (Latin, "the same as")
 IQ –
(i) Intelligence Quotient
(s) Iraq (ISO 3166 digram)
 IQD – (s) Iraqi dinar (ISO 4217 currency code)

IR
 Ir – (s) Iridium
 IR
 (i) Infrared
 Intelligence requirement (military)
 (s) Iran (FIPS 10-4 country code; ISO 3166 digram)
 Iran Air (IATA alpha code) see entry for more
 IRA
 (i) Individual retirement account
 (i) Irish Republican Army (any of several armed groups dedicated to Irish republicanism)
 Internet Research Agency (used in the Mueller report)
 IRAD – (a) Internal Research and Development
 IRAN - (I) Inspect and Repair As Necessary
 IRAS – (p) Infrared Astronomical Satellite
 IRB – (i) International Rugby Board, a former name of World Rugby
 IRBM – (i) Intermediate Range Ballistic Missile
 IRC
 (i) International Red Cross
 International reply coupon
 (i) Internet Relay Chat
 IREA
 (i) Intermountain Rural Electric Association
 (i) International Renewable Energy Alliance
 (p) Iranian Esperanto Association
 (i) Internet Radio Equality Act
 IRL
 (s) Ireland (ISO 3166 trigram)
 Industrial Research Limited
 Indy Racing League, former name of the motorsport governing body now known as INDYCAR
 (i) In real life
 IRM
 (i) Illinois Railway Museum
 Inzhenernaya Razvedyvatelnaya Mashina (Russian Инженерная Разведывательная Машина, "Engineer Reconnaissance Vehicle") †
 IRN – (s) Iran (ISO 3166 trigram)
 IRINN - Islamic Republic of Iran News Network
 IRO – (i) International Refugee Organisation
 IRQ – (s) Iraq (ISO 3166 trigram)
 IRR – (s) Iranian rial (ISO 4217 currency code)
 IRS – (i) U.S. Internal Revenue Service
 IRSN – (i) Institut de radioprotection et de sûreté nucléaire (French, "Institute for Radiation Protection and Nuclear Safety")
 IRST – (i) Infra-red Search and Track

IS
 is – (s) Icelandic language (ISO 639-1 code)
 IS
 (s) Iceland (ISO 3166 digram)
 Israel (FIPS 10-4 country code)
 ISA
 (i) Individual Savings Account
 Industry Standard Architecture
 Instruction Set Architecture
 International Seabed Authority
 ISAAA – (i) International Service for the Acquisition of Agri-biotech Applications
 ISAF
 (a) International Sailing Federation
 International Security Assistance Force
 ISAR – (a) Inverse SAR (Synthetic Aperture Radar)
 ISB – (i) Intermediate Staging Base
 ISBN – (i) International Standard Book Number (ISO 2108)
 ISCCP – (i) International Satellite Cloud Climatology Project
 ISCII – (a) Indian Standard Code for Information Interchange
 ISDN – Integrated Services Digital Network
 ISEF – (a) Intel International Science and Engineering Fair
 ISEN – (i) Internet Search Environment Number
 ISF – (i) Internal Security Force
 ISI
 Indian Standards Institute, former name of the Bureau of Indian Standards
 Inter-Services Intelligence (Pakistan)
 Islamic State of Iraq, an umbrella organization for several Iraqi insurgent groups
 ISIL – (i/a) Islamic State of Iraq and the Levant
 ISIS
 (i/a) Institute for Science and International Security
 Islamic State of Iraq and Syria
 ISK – (s) Icelandic krona (ISO 4217 currency code)
 isl – (s) Icelandic language (ISO 639-2 code)
 ISL – (s) Iceland (ISO 3166 trigram)
 ISLN – 
(i) International Standard Lawyer Number (used initially by LexisNexis Martindale-Hubbell)
(i) International School Libraries Network (HQ in Singapore)
(s) Isilon Systems, the NASDAQ symbol
 ISM
 (i) Industrial, scientific or medical
 (p) Interstellar medium
 ISMB – (i) International Society of Matrix Biologists
 ISMC – (i) Intelligent Sounding Meaningless Conversation
 ISO
 (i) In Search Of
 (s) International Organization for Standardization (from the Greek ίσος, isos, meaning "equal")
 ISOGP – (i) Indian Society of Orthodontics for General Practitioners 
 ISP
 (i) International Standardized Profile
 Internet Service Provider
 Information Systems Professional
 ISPE – (a/i) International Society for Pharmacoepidemiology
 ISR
 (i) Intelligence, Surveillance and Reconnaissance
 (s) Israel (ISO 3166 trigram)
 ISRO – (i) Indian Space Research Organisation
 ISS
 (i) International Shorebird Survey (North America)
 International Space Station
 ISSCR – (i) International Society for Stem Cell Research
 ISSN – (i) International standard serial number (ISO 3297)
 IST
 (i) Information System Technology
 UCF Institute for Simulation and Training
 ISTAR – (i) Intelligence, Surveillance, Target Acquisition, and Reconnaissance
 ISTC – (i) Institute of Scientific and Technical Communications (UK)
 ISTG – (i) I Swear To God
 ISTS – (i) Intel Science Talent Search
 ISU
 (i) Integrated Sight Unit
 International Skating Union

IT
 it – (s) Italian language (ISO 639-1 code)
 IT
 (i) InferoTemporal (neurophysiology)
 Information Technology
 (s) Italy (FIPS 10-4 country code; ISO 3166 digram)
 ita – (s) Italian language (ISO 639-2 code)
 ITA – (s) Italy (ISO 3166 trigram)
 ITAG – (i) Inertial Terrain-Aided Guidance
 ITALY – (a) I'll Truly Always Love You
 ITAS – (i) Improved Target Acquisition Sight
 ITC – (i) InferoTemporal Cortex (neurophysiology)
 ITCZ – (i/p) Intertropical Convergence Zone
 ITEC – (a) Information Technology Exposition & Conference
 ITEMS – (a) Interactive Tactical Environment Management System
 ITER – (a) International Thermonuclear Experimental Reactor
 ITF – (a) International Tennis Federation
 ITK – (a) In The Know 
 ITN – (i) Independent Television News (British)
 ITS
 (i) Incompatible Time-sharing System
 Individual Training Standards
 ITT – (i) International Telephone and Telegraph (U.S.)
 ITTO – (i) International Tropical Timber Organization
 ITU
 (i) Intent-to-Use
 International Telecommunication Union (International Telegraph Union 1865–1932)

IU
 iu – (s) (s) Inuktitut language (ISO 639-1 code)
 IUCN – (i) International Union for the Conservation of Nature and Natural Resources (World Conservation Union)
 IUD – (i) Intrauterine device (https://www.plannedparenthood.org/learn/birth-control/iud)
 IUI – (i) Intrauterine insemination (http://americanpregnancy.org/infertility/intrauterine-insemination/)
 IUPAC – (a) International Union of Pure and Applied Chemistry (pronounced "eye-yoo-pac")
IUPUI – (a) Indiana University – Purdue University Indianapolis
 IUSS – (i) Integrated Undersea Surveillance System – Integrated Unit Simulation System – International Union of Soil Sciences

IV
 IV – (s) Côte d'Ivoire (FIPS 10-4 country code; from Ivory Coast) – Four (in Roman numerals) – (i) IntraVenous (as in intravenous drip or intravenous therapy)
 IVD – (i) Internet Video Device, intra vas device
 Iveco – (p) Industrial Vehicles Corporation
 IVF – (i) In Vitro Fertilisation
 IVI – (i) Interchangeable Virtual Instrument
 IVIS – (i/a) Inter-Vehicle Information System
 IVL – (i) Inter-Visibility Line
 IVM – (i) In Vitro [Oocyte] Maturation
 IVO – (i) In Vicinity Of

IW
 IW – (i) Impact Wrestling
 IW – (i) Information Warfare
 IWARS – (p) Infantry Warrior Simulation
 IWC – (i) International Whaling Commission
 IWT – (i) Illegal Wildlife Trade
 IWW – (i) Industrial Workers of the World

IX
 IX – (s) Nine (in Roman numerals)
 IXT – (s) IntraText digital library; IntraText lexical hypertext

IY
 IY – (s) Saudi–Iraqi neutral zone (FIPS 10-4 territory code; obsolete 1993)
 Iykyk (acronym) – (i) If You Know You Know

IZ
 IZ – (s) Iraq (FIPS 10-4 country code)

References 

Acronyms I